Alan Christopher Chin (born in Berkeley, California October 15, 1987) is a contemporary American artist. He lives and maintains a studio in Hawthorne, California, working in variety of traditional and experimental mediums including, ceramics, film, painting, photography, sculpture, and performance.

Education
He graduated from Acalanes High School in Lafayette, California in 2005, receiving the Brad Chinn Leadership Award, Citizen of the Year, and United States Congressional recognition for Art. He attended Academie Minerva in Groningen, Netherlands and received his BFA in Ceramics and Painting (2011) at the California College of the Arts in Oakland, California

Early life
Greatly inspired by his creative family, surroundings, and nature; he studied traditional Japanese landscape, bonsai, and horticulture under Japanese Bonsai Masters, John Naka, Kunatoshi Akabane, and Yutaka Kimura. At age 11, he was chosen to have one of his bonsai trees included in the prestigious National Cherry Blossom Festival Bonsai Show in San Francisco.  By the age of 15 he was the youngest artist to be selected to paint one of the Hearts in San Francisco, benefiting the San Francisco General Hospital Foundation. Chin was assistant to American Painter Raymond Saunders from 2006 till 2013.

Work
His work has been shown in cities around the world and at institutions such as Berkeley Art Museum, California College of the Arts, Richmond Art Center, and the Tokyo Metropolitan Art Museum. Chin taught Painting Atilier at California College of the Arts and was invited back as a visiting lecturer in Ceramics.  He has helped to expand the Oakland Art Murmur (Oakland's First Friday Event) through increased awareness of art and bringing in the work of both established, emerging, local and international artists. In 2017, Chin was selected to represent the United States at the first East Lake International Ecological Sculpture Biennale in Wuhan, China.

References

1987 births
20th-century American painters
American male painters
21st-century American painters
American artists of Chinese descent
Living people
Artists from Berkeley, California
20th-century American sculptors
American male sculptors
Sculptors from California
20th-century American male artists